Richard Barnes may refer to:

Richard Barnes (author) (born 1944), English writer known for his association with rock band The Who
Richard Barnes (bishop) (1532–1587), Bishop of Durham
Richard Barnes (British politician) (born 1947), London politician
Richard Barnes (cricketer) (1849–1902), Australian cricketer
Richard Barnes (musician) (born 1944), British musician
Richard Barnes (Newfoundland politician) (1805–1846), Newfoundland businessman and politician
E. Richard Barnes (1906–1985), California politician
Rick Barnes (born 1954), American basketball coach
Rich Barnes (born 1959), American baseball player
Ricky Barnes (born 1981), American golfer

See also
Richard Barnes Mason (1797–1850), U.S. army officer